The Minister of Rationing and Supply (Sar HaKitzuv VeHaAspaka) was a short-lived portfolio in the Israeli cabinet. It was created on 26 April 1949 following a speech by Prime Minister David Ben-Gurion introducing the country's austerity programme, and was held by Dov Yosef. However, Ben-Gurion soon wanted the ministry closed down, and achieved his goal when forming the second government in October/November 1950 (the first government's collapse had been partially due to an internal crisis in the Mapai over the ministry's liquidation).

List of ministers

References

Government ministries of Israel
Lists of government ministers of Israel